The 2009–10 Oklahoma City Thunder season was the 2nd season of the franchise's existence in Oklahoma City as a member of the National Basketball Association (NBA).

With NBA scoring champion Kevin Durant, second-year point guard Russell Westbrook, and forward Jeff Green leading the way, the Thunder made the playoffs as the youngest team in the NBA with the 28th highest total salary in the league. The team became the youngest NBA playoff team (23.19, using data going back to 1952) based on average age weighted by minutes played. The Thunder were then eliminated by the defending and eventual NBA champions, the Los Angeles Lakers in six games in the First Round. The 2009–10 Oklahoma City Thunder and the 2007–08 Denver Nuggets are tied at 50–32 for having the best 8th seed record in NBA history. This was also the first season for James Harden.

From a business perspective, the team began to show positive financial performance after years of losses in Seattle and a transition-cost laden 2008–09 season.  In December 2009, Forbes magazine estimated the team's operating profit at $12.7 million, and estimated the overall franchise value at $310 million, good for 20th in the NBA.

Key dates
 June 25, 2009: The 2009 NBA draft took place in New York City.
 July 8, 2009: The free agency period started.
 October 28, 2009: The Thunder play their first regular-season game, and achieve their first regular-season victory, in a 102-89 home win over the Sacramento Kings.
 January 2, 2010 Kevin Durant scored more than 30 points in his seventh consecutive game, breaking the franchise record set by Spencer Haywood in January 1972.
 January 20, 2010: The Thunder surpass their win total from 2008 to 2009 with their 24th season victory, a 94-92 win at the Minnesota Timberwolves.
 February 24, 2010: Kevin Durant's 21 points in a loss to the San Antonio Spurs ends his streak of 29 consecutive games with 25 or more points.
 March 2, 2010: The Thunder surpass the 500,000 season home attendance figure in a 113-107 victory over the Sacramento Kings at the Ford Center.
 March 12, 2010: Durant had his 36th game with 30 or more points this season, breaking the franchise record set by Spencer Haywood in the 1972–73 season. Durant ended the regular season with 41 games of 30 points or more.
 April 3, 2010: The Thunder clinch a playoff spot for the first time in city franchise history with a 121-116 victory over the Dallas Mavericks.
 April 14, 2010: Durant becomes the youngest scoring leader at the age of 21, taking the distinction from Max Zaslofsky (1947–48 BAA scoring leader at the age of 22).  The Thunder also end the season on a positive note, beating the Memphis Grizzlies 114-105 – their 27th season home sellout, bringing total home attendance to 738,149 (an average of 18,003 per game, 12th in the NBA).
 April 22, 2010: The Thunder win their first-ever Oklahoma City franchise playoff game with a 101-96 victory over the Los Angeles Lakers at the Ford Center.

Draft picks

Roster

Salaries

Source: HoopsHype

Game log

Preseason

Regular season

Standings

Division

Conference

Record vs. opponents

Game log

|- style="background:#bfb;"
| 1
| October 28
| Sacramento Kings
| 
| Kevin Durant (25)
| Kevin Durant (11)
| Russell Westbrook (13)
| Ford Center18,203
| 1–0
|- style="background:#bfb;"
| 2
| October 30
| @ Detroit Pistons
| 
| Kevin Durant (25)
| Kevin Durant (12)
| Russell Westbrook (10)
| The Palace of Auburn Hills22,076
| 2–0
|-

|- style="background:#fcc;"
| 3
| November 1
| Portland Trail Blazers
| 
| Russell Westbrook (23)
| Jeff Green (11)
| Russell Westbrook, James Harden (2)
| Ford Center16,920
| 2–1
|- style="background:#fcc;"
| 4
| November 3
| Los Angeles Lakers
| 
| Kevin Durant (28)
| Etan Thomas (11)
| Russell Westbrook (7)
| Ford Center18,203
| 2–2
|- style="background:#fcc;"
| 5
| November 6
| @ Houston Rockets
| 
| Russell Westbrook (33)
| Kevin Durant (9)
| Russell Westbrook (7)
| Toyota Center14,911
| 2–3
|- style="background:#bfb;"
| 6
| November 8
| Orlando Magic
| 
| Kevin Durant (28)
| Thabo Sefolosha (10)
| Russell Westbrook (10)
| Ford Center18,203
| 3–3
|- style="background:#fcc;"
| 7
| November 10
| @ Sacramento Kings
| 
| Kevin Durant (37)
| Nenad Krstić (8)
| Russell Westbrook, Thabo Sefolosha (6)
| ARCO Arena10,523
| 3–4
|- style="background:#bfb;"
| 8
| November 11
| @ Los Angeles Clippers
| 
| Kevin Durant (30)
| Kevin Durant (10)
| James Harden (8)
| Staples Center14,248
| 4–4
|- style="background:#bfb;"
| 9
| November 14
| @ San Antonio Spurs
| 
| Kevin Durant (25)
| Jeff Green (10)
| Russell Westbrook (11)
| AT&T Center17,947
| 5–4
|- style="background:#fcc;"
| 10
| November 15
| Los Angeles Clippers
| 
| Kevin Durant (40)
| Russell Westbrook (9)
| Russell Westbrook (7)
| Ford Center17,715
| 5–5
|- style="background:#bfb;"
| 11
| November 17
| @ Miami Heat
| 
| Kevin Durant (32)
| Kevin Durant, Thabo Sefolosha (9)
| Russell Westbrook (7)
| American Airlines Arena14,443
| 6–5
|- style="background:#fcc;"
| 12
| November 18
| @ Orlando Magic
| 
| James Harden (24)
| Serge Ibaka (9)
| Kyle Weaver, Kevin Ollie (4)
| Amway Arena17,461
| 6–6
|- style="background:#bfb;"
| 13
| November 20
| Washington Wizards
| 
| Kevin Durant (35)
| Jeff Green (14)
| Russell Westbrook (7)
| Ford Center18,203
| 7–6
|- style="background:#fcc;"
| 14
| November 22
| @ Los Angeles Lakers
| 
| Kevin Durant (19)
| Serge Ibaka (13)
| Russell Westbrook (7)
| Staples Center18,997
| 7–7
|- style="background:#bfb;"
| 15
| November 24
| @ Utah Jazz
| 
| Kevin Durant (28)
| Jeff Green, Nenad Krstić (6)
| Kevin Durant (8)
| EnergySolutions Arena17,937
| 8–7
|- style="background:#bfb;"
| 16
| November 27
| Milwaukee Bucks
| 
| Kevin Durant (33)
| Kevin Durant (12)
| Russell Westbrook (7)
| Ford Center18,203
| 9–7
|- style="background:#fcc;"
| 17
| November 29
| Houston Rockets
| 
| Kevin Durant (25)
| Kevin Durant (9)
| Kevin Durant (6)
| Ford Center18,203
| 9–8
|-

|- style="background:#bfb;"
| 18
| December 2
| Philadelphia 76ers
| 
| Kevin Durant (33)
| Nick Collison (7)
| Russell Westbrook (15)
| Ford Center17,332
| 10–8
|- style="background:#fcc;"
| 19
| December 4
| Boston Celtics
| 
| Kevin Durant (36)
| Kevin Durant (5)
| Russell Westbrook (4)
| Ford Center18,203
| 10–9
|- style="background:#bfb;"
| 20
| December 7
| Golden State Warriors
| 
| Kevin Durant (28)
| Jeff Green (13)
| James Harden (5)
| Ford Center17,334
| 11–9
|- style="background:#bfb;"
| 21
| December 11
| @ Memphis Grizzlies
| 
| Kevin Durant (32)
| Kevin Durant (10)
| Russell Westbrook (7)
| FedExForum13,048
| 12–9
|- style="background:#fcc;"
| 22
| December 13
| Cleveland Cavaliers
| 
| Kevin Durant (29)
| Nenad Krstić (8)
| Russell Westbrook (5)
| Ford Center18,203
| 12–10
|- style="background:#fcc;"
| 23
| December 14
| @ Denver Nuggets
| 
| Kevin Durant (32)
| Kevin Durant (10)
| Russell Westbrook (6)
| Pepsi Center16,022
| 12–11
|- style="background:#fcc;"
| 24
| December 16
| Dallas Mavericks
| 
| Russell Westbrook (16)
| Jeff Green (11)
| Russell Westbrook (5)
| Ford Center18,203
| 12–12
|- style="background:#bfb;"
| 25
| December 18
| Detroit Pistons
| 
| Kevin Durant (27)
| Nenad Krstić (8)
| James Harden (8)
| Ford Center17,774
| 13–12
|- style="background:#fcc;"
| 26
| December 19
| @ Houston Rockets
| 
| Jeff Green (21)
| Jeff Green, Thabo Sefolosha, Serge Ibaka (8)
| Russell Westbrook (7)
| Toyota Center15,095
| 13–13
|- style="background:#fcc;"
| 27
| December 22
| @ Los Angeles Lakers
| 
| Kevin Durant (30)
| Jeff Green, Russell Westbrook (7)
| Russell Westbrook (13)
| Staples Center18,997
| 13–14
|- style="background:#bfb;"
| 28
| December 23
| @ Phoenix Suns
| 
| Kevin Durant (38)
| Jeff Green (9)
| Russell Westbrook (7)
| US Airways Center15,953
| 14–14
|- style="background:#bfb;"
| 29
| December 26
| Charlotte Bobcats
| 
| Kevin Durant (30)
| Nenad Krstić (10)
| Russell Westbrook (6) 
| Ford Center17,961
| 15–14
|- style="background:#bfb;"
| 30
| December 28
| @ New Jersey Nets
| 
| Kevin Durant (40)
| Nick Collison (10)
| Russell Westbrook (10)
| Izod Center15,335
| 16–14
|- style="background:#bfb;"
| 31
| December 29
| @ Washington Wizards
| 
| Kevin Durant (35)
| Kevin Durant (11)
| Russell Westbrook (10)
| Verizon Center17,152
| 17–14
|- style="background:#bfb;"
| 32
| December 31
| Utah Jazz
| 
| Kevin Durant (31)
| Kevin Durant (8)
| Russell Westbrook (10)
| Ford Center18,203
| 18–14
|-

|- style="background:#fcc;"
| 33
| January 2
| @ Milwaukee Bucks
| 
| Kevin Durant (31)
| Thabo Sefolosha, Russell Westbrook (9)
| Russell Westbrook (13)
| Bradley Center15,264
| 18–15
|- style="background:#bfb;"
| 34
| January 4
| @ Chicago Bulls
| 
| Russell Westbrook (29)
| Thabo Sefolosha (9)
| Russell Westbrook (6)
| United Center18,838
| 19–15
|- style="background:#fcc;"
| 35
| January 6
| New Orleans Hornets
| 
| Kevin Durant (27)
| Thabo Sefolosha, Nick Collison (7)
| Russell Westbrook (9)
| Ford Center17,836
| 19–16
|- style="background:#bfb;"
| 36
| January 9
| Indiana Pacers
| 
| Kevin Durant (40)
| Kevin Durant (12)
| Russell Westbrook (6)
| Ford Center18,203
| 20–16
|- style="background:#bfb;"
| 37
| January 11
| New York Knicks
| 
| Kevin Durant (30)
| Nenad Krstić, Thabo Sefolosha (8)
| Russell Westbrook (5)
| Ford Center17,152
| 21–16
|- style="background:#fcc;"
| 38
| January 13
| San Antonio Spurs
| 
| Kevin Durant (35)
| Jeff Green (10)
| Russell Westbrook (13)
| Ford Center17,886
| 21–17
|- style="background:#fcc;"
| 39
| January 15
| @ Dallas Mavericks
| 
| Kevin Durant (30)
| Kevin Durant (13)
| Russell Westbrook (6)
| American Airlines Center20,064
| 21–18
|- style="background:#bfb;"
| 40
| January 16
| Miami Heat
| 
| Kevin Durant (36)
| Kevin Durant, Serge Ibaka (10)
| Russell Westbrook (11)
| Ford Center18,203
| 22–18
|- style="background:#bfb;"
| 41
| January 18
| @ Atlanta Hawks
| 
| Kevin Durant (29)
| Jeff Green (11)
| Russell Westbrook (9)
| Philips Arena14,666
| 23–18
|- style="background:#bfb;"
| 42
| January 20
| @ Minnesota Timberwolves
| 
| Kevin Durant (31)
| Kevin Durant (10)
| Russell Westbrook (9)
| Target Center12,995
| 24–18
|- style="background:#fcc;"
| 43
| January 22
| @ Memphis Grizzlies
| 
| Kevin Durant (30)
| Kevin Durant, Jeff Green (8)
| Eric Maynor (6)
| FedEx Forum12,948
| 24–19
|- style="background:#fcc;"
| 44
| January 23
| @ Cleveland Cavaliers
| 
| Kevin Durant (34)
| Kevin Durant (10)
| Russell Westbrook (5)
| Quicken Loans Arena20,562
| 24–20
|- style="background:#fcc;"
| 45
| January 27
| Chicago Bulls
| 
| Kevin Durant (28)
| Kevin Durant (11)
| Russell Westbrook (7)
| Ford Center17,562
| 24–21
|- style="background:#bfb;"
| 46
| January 29
| Denver Nuggets
| 
| Kevin Durant (30)
| Serge Ibaka (8)
| Russell Westbrook (8)
| Ford Center18,203
| 25–21
|- style="background:#bfb;"
| 47
| January 31
| Golden State Warriors
| 
| Kevin Durant (45)
| Kevin Durant (11)
| Russell Westbrook (8)
| Ford Center17,565
| 26–21
|-

|- style="background:#bfb;"
| 48
| February 2
| Atlanta Hawks
| 
| Kevin Durant (33)
| Kevin Durant (11)
| Russell Westbrook (9)
| Ford Center17,360
| 27–21
|- style="background:#bfb;"
| 49
| February 3
| @ New Orleans Hornets
| 
| Kevin Durant (30)
| Nick Collison (10)
| Russell Westbrook (10)
| New Orleans Arena12,884
| 28–21
|- style="background:#bfb;"
| 50
| February 6
| @ Golden State Warriors
| 
| Kevin Durant (29)
| Nick Collison (10)
| Russell Westbrook (10)
| Oracle Arena17,825
| 29–21
|- style="background:#bfb;"
| 51
| February 9
| @ Portland Trail Blazers
| 
| Kevin Durant (33)
| Kevin Durant (11)
| Russell Westbrook (7)
| Rose Garden Arena20,460
| 30–21
|- style="background:#bfb;"
| 52
| February 16
| Dallas Mavericks
| 
| Kevin Durant (25)
| Kevin Durant (14)
| Russell Westbrook (8)
| Ford Center18,203
| 31–21
|- style="background:#bfb;"
| 53
| February 20
| @ New York Knicks
| 
| Kevin Durant (36)
| Jeff Green (11)
| Russell Westbrook (10)
| Madison Square Garden19,763
| 32–21
|- style="background:#bfb;"
| 54
| February 21
| @ Minnesota Timberwolves
| 
| Kevin Durant (32)
| Jeff Green (14)
| Russell Westbrook (14)
| Target Center14,202
| 33–21
|- style="background:#fcc;"
| 55
| February 23
| Phoenix Suns
| 
| Kevin Durant (36)
| Kevin Durant (8)
| Russell Westbrook (10)
| Ford Center18,203
| 33–22
|- style="background:#fcc;"
| 56
| February 24
| @ San Antonio Spurs
| 
| Kevin Durant (21)
| Thabo Sefolosha (13)
| Russell Westbrook (7)
| AT&T Center18,400
| 33–23
|- style="background:#bfb;"
| 57
| February 26
| Minnesota Timberwolves
| 
| Kevin Durant (25)
| Kevin Durant (9)
| Russell Westbrook (15)
| Ford Center18,203
| 34–23
|- style="background:#bfb;"
| 58
| February 28
| Toronto Raptors
| 
| Kevin Durant (29)
| Serge Ibaka (10)
| Russell Westbrook (10)
| Ford Center18,203
| 35–23
|-

|- style="background:#bfb;"
| 59
| March 2
| Sacramento Kings
| 
| Kevin Durant (39)
| Kevin Durant (10)
| Russell Westbrook (13)
| Ford Center17,677
| 36–23
|- style="background:#fcc;"
| 60
| March 3
| @ Denver Nuggets
| 
| Kevin Durant, James Harden (19)
| Serge Ibaka (13)
| Russell Westbrook (6)
| Pepsi Center18,822
| 36–24
|- style="background:#bfb;"
| 61
| March 5
| @ Los Angeles Clippers
| 
| Kevin Durant (32)
| Nenad Kristic (11)
| Russell Westbrook (9)
| Staples Center18,497
| 37–24
|- style="background:#bfb;"
| 62
| March 7
| @ Sacramento Kings
| 
| Kevin Durant (27)
| Nenad Krstić (10)
| Kevin Durant (5)
| ARCO Arena12,081
| 38–24
|- style="background:#bfb;"
| 63
| March 10
| New Orleans Hornets
| 
| Kevin Durant (29)
| Jeff Green, Serge Ibaka (9)
| Russell Westbrook (9)
| Ford Center18,203
| 39–24
|- style="background:#bfb;"
| 64
| March 12
| New Jersey Nets
| 
| Kevin Durant (32)
| Kevin Durant (12)
| Russell Westbrook (10)
| Ford Center18,203
| 40–24
|- style="background:#bfb;"
| 65
| March 14
| Utah Jazz
| 
| Kevin Durant (35)
| Serge Ibaka, Thabo Sefolosha (6)
| Russell Westbrook (11)
| Ford Center18,203
| 41–24
|- style="background:#fcc;"
| 66
| March 17
| @ Charlotte Bobcats
| 
| Kevin Durant (26)
| Kevin Durant (10)
| Russell Westbrook (10)
| Time Warner Cable Arena16,179
| 41–25
|- style="background:#bfb;"
| 67
| March 19
| @ Toronto Raptors
| 
| Kevin Durant (31)
| Nenad Krstić, Nick Collison (8)
| Russell Westbrook (10)
| Air Canada Centre19,351
| 42–25
|- style="background:#fcc;"
| 68
| March 21
| @ Indiana Pacers
| 
| Jeff Green (20)
| Serge Ibaka (12)
| Eric Maynor (11)
| Conseco Fieldhouse14,701
| 42–26
|- style="background:#fcc;"
| 69
| March 22
| San Antonio Spurs
| 
| Kevin Durant (45)
| Kevin Durant, Serge Ibaka (8)
| Eric Maynor (5)
| Ford Center18,203
| 42–27
|- style="background:#bfb;"
| 70
| March 24
| Houston Rockets
| 
| Kevin Durant (25)
| Nick Collison (9)
| Eric Maynor (9)
| Ford Center18,203
| 43–27
|- style="background:#bfb;"
| 71
| March 26
| Los Angeles Lakers
| 
| Kevin Durant (26)
| Nenad Krstić (10)
| Russell Westbrook (6)
| Ford Center18,203
| 44–27
|- style="background:#fcc;"
| 72
| March 28
| Portland Trail Blazers
| 
| Kevin Durant (29)
| Kevin Durant (13)
| Russell Westbrook (6)
| Ford Center18,203
| 44–28
|- style="background:#bfb;"
| 73
| March 30
| @ Philadelphia 76ers
| 
| Kevin Durant (26)
| Kevin Durant (10)
| Russell Westbrook (14)
| Wachovia Center14,809
| 45–28
|- style="background:#bfb;"
| 74
| March 31
| @ Boston Celtics
| 
| Kevin Durant (37)
| Kevin Durant, Nenad Krstić (8)
| Russell Westbrook (10)
| TD Garden18,624
| 46–28
|-

|- style="background:#bfb;"
| 75
| April 3
| @ Dallas Mavericks
| 
| Kevin Durant (23)
| Nenad Krstić (6)
| Russell Westbrook (6)
| American Airlines Center20,329
| 47–28
|- style="background:#bfb;"
| 76
| April 4
| Minnesota Timberwolves
| 
| Kevin Durant (40)
| Jeff Green (10)
| Russell Westbrook (16)
| Ford Center18,203
| 48–28
|- style="background:#fcc;"
| 77
| April 6
| @ Utah Jazz
| 
| Kevin Durant (45)
| Kevin Durant, Jeff Green (7)
| Russell Westbrook (9)
| EnergySolutions Arena19,911
| 48–29
|- style="background:#fcc;"
| 78
| April 7
| Denver Nuggets
| 
| Kevin Durant (33)
| Kevin Durant (11)
| Jeff Green (5)
| Ford Center18,332
| 48–30
|- style="background:#bfb;"
| 79
| April 9
| Phoenix Suns
| 
| Kevin Durant (35)
| Kevin Durant, Serge Ibaka (9)
| Russell Westbrook (10)
| Ford Center18,334
| 49–30
|- style="background:#fcc;"
| 80
| April 11
| @ Golden State Warriors
| 
| Kevin Durant (40)
| Nick Collison, Serge Ibaka (12)
| Russell Westbrook (9)
| Oracle Arena18,940
| 49–31
|- style="background:#fcc;"
| 81
| April 12
| @ Portland Trail Blazers
| 
| Kevin Durant (30)
| Thabo Sefolosha (8)
| Eric Maynor (5)
| Rose Garden Arena20,691
| 49–32
|- style="background:#bfb;"
| 82
| April 14
| Memphis Grizzlies
| 
| Kevin Durant (31)
| Serge Ibaka (9)
| Eric Maynor (10)
| Ford Center18,334
| 50–32

Playoffs

Game log

|- style="background:#fcc;"
| 1
| April 18
| @ L.A. Lakers
| 
| Kevin Durant (24)
| Nick Collison (8)
| Russell Westbrook (8)
| Staples Center18,997
| 0–1
|- style="background:#fcc;"
| 2
| April 20
| @ L.A. Lakers
| 
| Kevin Durant (33)
| Kevin Durant (8)
| Thabo Sefolosha, Russell Westbrook (3)
| Staples Center18,997
| 0–2
|- style="background:#bfb;"
| 3
| April 22
| L.A. Lakers
| 
| Kevin Durant (29)
| Kevin Durant (19)
| Kevin Durant, Russell Westbrook (4)
| Ford Center18,342
| 1–2
|- style="background:#bfb;"
| 4
| April 24
| L.A. Lakers
| 
| Kevin Durant (22)
| Jeff Green (9)
| Russell Westbrook (6)
| Ford Center18,342
| 2–2
|- style="background:#fcc;"
| 5
| April 27
| @ L.A. Lakers
| 
| Kevin Durant (17)
| Serge Ibaka (9)
| Russell Westbrook (6)
| Staples Center18,997
| 2–3
|- style="background:#fcc;"
| 6
| April 30
| L.A. Lakers
| 
| Kevin Durant (26)
| Nenad Krstić (11)
| Russell Westbrook (9)
| Ford Center18,342
| 2–4

Player statistics

Season

1Stats with the Thunder.

Playoffs

2010 NBA Western Conference First Round vs. L.A. Lakers

Awards and honors

Weekly
 Kevin Durant was named Western Conference Player of the Week for December 28–January 3.
 Kevin Durant was named Western Conference Player of the Week for January 25–31.
 Russell Westbrook was named Western Conference Player of the Week for February 1–7.
 Kevin Durant was named Western Conference Player of the Week for March 29–April 4.

Monthly
 Scott Brooks was named Western Conference Coach of the Month for February 2010.
 Kevin Durant was named Western Conference Player of the Month for April 2010.

All-Star
 Kevin Durant was selected as an All-Star for the first time in his career, representing the Western Conference.
 Rookie James Harden was named to the Rookie Team roster in the T-Mobile Rookie Challenge.
 Second-year player Russell Westbrook was named to the Sopohomore Team roster in the T-Mobile Rookie Challenge.
 Kevin Durant defended his title as H-O-R-S-E competition champion.
 Russell Westbrook was selected to replace the injured Derrick Rose in the 2010 Taco Bell Skills Challenge.

Season
 Scott Brooks was named NBA Coach of the Year.
 Kevin Durant won the NBA scoring title.
 James Harden was named to the NBA All-Rookie Second Team.
 Thabo Sefolosha was named to the NBA All-Defensive Second Team.
 Kevin Durant was named to the All-NBA First Team.

Transactions

Overview

Trades

Free agency

Re-signed

Additions

Subtractions

References

External links
 ESPN OKC Schedule

Oklahoma City Thunder seasons
Oklahoma City
2009 in sports in Oklahoma
2010 in sports in Oklahoma

ko:오클라호마시티 썬더